Päivi Maarit Hirvelä (born 10 December 1954) is a Finnish former judge on the European Court of Human Rights. Hirvelä is on leave from the Finnish state prosecutor's office. Hirvelä holds a doctorate in law.

Hirvelä worked as a general legal assistant in Sodankylä and Lahti, Finland 1981-82, referendary of the Kouvola Court of Appeal of 1984–1990 and after a district prosecutor in Lahti, until she was appointed Public Prosecutor in 1999. She has also worked in the European Court of Human Rights Secretariat as a lawyer and a rapporteur of the Parliamentary Ombudsman's Office. She began her post as a judge on the European Court of Human Rights on 1 January 2007.

References

Judges of the European Court of Human Rights
20th-century Finnish lawyers
1954 births
Living people
Finnish judges of international courts and tribunals
21st-century Finnish judges